Gas Turbine Research Establishment (GTRE) is a laboratory of the Defence Research and Development Organisation (DRDO). Located in Bengaluru, its primary function is research and development of aero gas-turbines for military aircraft. As a spin-off effect, GTRE has been developing marine gas-turbines also.

It was initially known as GTRC (Gas Turbine Research Centre), created in 1959 in No.4 BRD Air Force Station, Kanpur, Uttar Pradesh. In November 1961 it was brought under DRDO, renamed to GTRE and moved to Bengaluru, Karnataka.

Products

Principal achievements of Gas Turbine Research Establishment include:
 Design and development of India's "first centrifugal type 10 kN thrust engine" between 1959-61.
 Design and development of a "1700K reheat system" for the Orpheus 703 engine to boost its power. The redesigned system was certified in 1973.
 Successful upgrade of the reheat system of the Orpheus 703 to 2000K.
 Improvement of the Orpheus 703 engine by replacing "the front subsonic compressor stage" with a "transonic compressor stage" to increase the "basic dry thrust" of the engine.
 Design and development of a "demonstrator" gas turbine engine—GTX 37-14U—for fighter aircraft. Performance trials commenced in 1977 and the "demonstrator phase" was completed in 1981. The GTX 37-14U was "configured" and "optimized" to build a "low by-pass ratio jet engine" for "multirole performance aircraft". This engine was dubbed GTX 37-14U B.

GTX Kaveri

GTX-35VS Kaveri Engine was intended to power production models of HAL Tejas.

Defending the program GTRE mentioned reasons for delay including:
 Non availability of state of the art wind tunnel facility in India
 The technology restrictions imposed by US by placing it in "entities" list

Both hurdles having been cleared, GTRE intended to continue work on the AMCA (future generation fighter craft).

This program was abandoned in 2014.

Kaveri Marine Gas Turbine (KMGT)

Kaveri Marine Gas Turbine is a design spin-off from the Kaveri engine, designed for Indian combat aircraft. Using the core of the Kaveri engine, GTRE added low-pressure compressor and turbine as a gas generator and designed a free power turbine to generate shaft power for maritime applications.

The involvement of Indian Navy in the development and testing of the engine has given a tremendous boost to the programme.

Ghatak 
The Ghatak engine will be a 52-kilonewton dry variant of the Kaveri aerospace engine and will be used in the UCAV (Unmanned Combat Aerial Vehicles). The Government of India has cleared a funding of ₹2,650 crores ($394 Million) for the project.

Manik Engine/Small Turbo Fan Engine (STFE) 
GTRE is developing a new 4.25 kN thrust turbofan engine to power Nirbhay cruise missile and future UAV, Long range AshM/LAM cruise missile systems. GTRE is working fast to add test capabilities and infrastructure to test the Manik engine.

Testing
The KMGT was tested on the Marine Gas Turbine test bed, an Indian Navy facility at Vishakhapatnam.

The engine has been tested to its potential of 12 MW at ISA SL 35 °C condition, a requirement of the Navy to propel SNF class ships, such as the Rajput class destroyers.

References

External links

 DIRECTORATE OF AERONAUTICS 
 Gas Turbine Research Establishment
 Gas Turbine Research Establishment (GTRE)

Defence Research and Development Organisation laboratories
Research institutes in Bangalore
Engineering research institutes
Aircraft engine manufacturers of India
Gas turbine manufacturers
Marine engine manufacturers
Research institutes in Lucknow
Engine manufacturers of India
1959 establishments in Mysore State